Steel Magnolias is a stage play by American writer Robert Harling, based on his experience with his sister's death. The play is a comedy-drama about the bond among a group of Southern women in northwest Louisiana.

The title suggests the "female characters are as delicate as magnolias but as tough as steel". The magnolia specifically references a magnolia tree they are arguing about at the beginning.

Synopsis 
Set in the fictional northwestern Louisiana parish of Chinquapin, the play opens at Truvy's in-home beauty parlor where a group of women regularly gather. They discuss Shelby's upcoming wedding to her fiancé, Jackson. The plot covers events over the next three years relating to Shelby's Type 1 diabetes, and with how the women cope with their conflicts, while remaining friends: Shelby's decision to have a child despite jeopardizing her health, Clairee's friendship with the curmudgeon Ouiser; Annelle's transformation from a shy, anxious newcomer in town to a good-time girl then repentant revival-tent Christian; and Truvy's relationships with the men in her family. Although the main storyline involves Shelby, her mother M'Lynn, and Shelby's medical battles, the group's underlying friendship is prominent throughout the drama.

Historical casting

Background 
The play is based on the family experience of the death of author Robert Harling's sister, Susan Harling-Robinson, in 1985 from diabetic complications after the birth of his namesake nephew and the failure of a family-member donated kidney. Following the death, a writer friend advised him to write it down to come to terms with the experience. He did but originally as a short story to give his nephew an understanding of the child's deceased mother. It eventually evolved in ten days to a play performed Off-Broadway before being adapted for the Steel Magnolias movie (1989).

Harling, maybe based on his short, dry experience in the field of law ("not many laughs in Brown v. Board of Education"), felt it important to include the way the characters used humor and lighthearted conversations to cope with the seriousness of the underlying situations. Harling wanted the audience to have a true representation of what his family endured during his sister's experience.

Production history

US productions 
The play originally opened Off-Broadway (with one set and an all-female cast although the voice of a male DJ on the radio is intermittent during the play with all male "characters" referenced only through dialogue) at the WPA Theatre, in New York City, on March 28, 1987, with Pamela Berlin as director.

The production transferred to the Lucille Lortel Theatre on June 19, 1987, and closed on February 25, 1990 after 1,126 performances. Replacements during the original Off-Broadway run included Anne Pitoniak, Bette Henritze, Rita Gardner, Maeve McGuire, and Stacy Ray.

A U.S. national tour was launched in 1989. Marion Ross joined the tour as Clairee late in the run.

The play made its Broadway debut in 2005 and opened at the Lyceum Theatre, in previews starting on March 15, and officially opened April 4, and closed on July 31, 2005, after 23 previews and 136 performances, directed by Jason Moore.

Guthrie Theater did a production from October 26 to December 15, 2019 directed by Lisa Rothe.

UK productions 
The premiere UK production opened in the West End in March 1989 at the Lyric Theatre, directed by Julia McKenzie.

It returned to the West End for a limited engagement at the Westminster Theatre March 30-April 9, 1990, in a production mounted by Rose Bruford College.

A tour of the show opened at the Theatre Royal Bath on April 2, 2012, and was scheduled to play at ten theatres including the Richmond Theatre in London during an eleven-week run. It was directed by David Gilmore.

International productions
Australia:
Nicole Kidman made her professional stage debut in first Australian production as Shelby. The show opened 18 May 1988 in the York Theatre at Sydney’s Seymour Centre and went on to play Melbourne’s Athenaeum Theatre. The cast also included Nancye Hayes, Maggie Dence, Melissa Jaffer, Genevieve Lemon, Pat McDonald, and Peter Snook.

Ireland:
Staged at the Gaiety Theatre, Dublin on September 11–22, 2012, directed by Ben Barnes, and on country-wide tour until October 19 the same year. The cast included Mischa Barton and Anne Charleston.

France:
Coiffure et Confidences, the French-language adaptation by Didier Caron directed by Dominique Guillo, premiered in Paris at the Théâtre Michel in October 2014. After three successful runs in Paris and multiple nationwide tours, its final performance, attended by Robert Harling, was filmed on June 12, 2017 and released on the French channel C8 a few months later.

Cast:

Thérèse (Truvy) - Marie-Hélène Lentini / Isabelle Ferron
Jeanne (M'Lynn) - Astrid Veillon / Élisabeth Vitali / Anne Richard
Magalie (Shelby) - Léa François
Agnès (Annelle) - Sandrine Le Berre
Claire (Clairee) - Isabelle Tanakil / Isabelle Ferron / Élisabeth Buffet
Odette (Ouiser) - Brigitte Faure

Japan:
Staged by the Haiyuza Theatre Company on November 14–25, 2007, in Tokyo, translated and directed by Hajime Mori. Cast: Mayuko Aoyama as Truvy, Kaoru Inoue as Annelle, Mayumi Katayam as Clairee, Midori Ando as Shelby, Atsuko Kawaguchi as M'Lynn and Minae as Ouiser.

Poland:
It premiered at the Aleksandra Wegierki Dramatic Theatre in Bialystok on April 14, 1992. Jean Korf was the director and the play was translated by Catherine Peebles and Andrzej Jakimiec. It was organized with help from the Embassy of the United States, Warsaw, especially the Cultural Attache, Bruce Byers.

On March 29, 2017, the U.S. Embassy Warsaw held two English-language staged readings at Teatr Polski Arnold Szyfman Theatre in Warsaw as the capstone to its Women's History Month Programming. The production was directed by Deputy Press Attache Stephen E. Dreikorn and featured an all-embassy employee cast consisting of both American and Polish employees. Polish director and actor Andrzej Seweryn spoke before one of the performances and called the Embassy's production a "great initiative".

Sweden:
Premiered on November 16, 2008 at Vasateatern in Stockholm (with Robert Harling in attendance) titled "Blommor av Stål", it was directed by Emma Bucht and translated by Klas Östergren and Edward af Sillén. The cast: Cecilia Nilsson as Truvy, Pernilla August as M'Lynn, Melinda Kinnaman as Shelby, Suzanne Reuter as Ouiser, Linda Ulvaeus as Annelle and Gunilla Nyroos as Clairee.

Screen adaptations

Film 

The play was adapted as a film in 1988 and released in 1989, with a screenplay also by Harling and directed by Herbert Ross. The film was able to expand the story of the play with additional background stories and characters. Julia Roberts was nominated for the Academy Award for Best Supporting Actress for her performance as Shelby.

Television 

CBS-TV produced the two-hour Steel Magnolias sitcom pilot in April 1990 in Robert Harling's childhood hometown of Natchitoches, Louisiana. Robert was screenwriter with his script being a continuation of the play and 1989 film following the death of Shelby. Thomas Schlamme directed and cast included: Cindy Williams as M’Lynn, Sally Kirkland as Truvy, Elaine Stritch as Ouiser, Polly Bergen as Clairee, and Sheila McCarthy as Annelle. Ultimately, CBS passed on the series giving the pilot a single airing on August 17, 1990.

2012 television film 

The play was adapted as a television film in 2012 with an African-American cast set in fictional Chinquapin for a Lifetime TV production filmed in Atlanta, April 2012 (aired October 2012): directed by Kenny Leon and scripted by Sally Robinson.
 Cast: Queen Latifah as M'Lynn, Jill Scott as Truvy, Alfre Woodard as Ouiser, Phylicia Rashad as Clairee, Adepero Oduye as Annelle, and Condola Rashad as Shelby.

References

External links 

 
 
 Brief synopsis and history at dramatists.com

1987 plays
Off-Broadway plays
American plays adapted into films
Plays set in Louisiana
Plays by Robert Harling